"Busted" is a song written by Harlan Howard in 1962.  It was recorded by Johnny Cash (with the Carter Family) for Cash's 1963 album Blood, Sweat and Tears. It has been recorded by several notable artists, including Ray Charles (also in 1963), John Conlee (1982) and Chris Ledoux (1982).

Charting versions
Johnny Cash, with the Carter Family, reached No. 13 on Billboards Hot Country Singles chart in 1963.
Ray Charles reached No. 4 on the Billboard Hot 100 chart in 1963. This was from his album Ingredients in a Recipe for Soul.  A live version with Willie Nelson was included in Charles' 2005 duets album Genius & Friends.
John Conlee reached No. 6 on Billboards Hot Country Singles chart in 1982.

References

External links
Harlan Howard obituaries: New York Times and bmi.com
"Busted" at Allmusic.com 

1962 songs
1963 singles
1982 singles
Ray Charles songs
Johnny Cash songs
Charley Pride songs
Nazareth (band) songs
John Conlee songs
Chris LeDoux songs
Patty Loveless songs
Wanda Jackson songs
Songs written by Harlan Howard